Saint Pamphilus of Sulmona (d. early 8th century) was bishop of Sulmona and a saint.

Pamphilus was born in Abruzzo, probably around the middle of the 7th century. He was the son of a pagan who repudiated him when he converted to Christianity. He was elected bishop of Sulmona in 682. He is traditionally described as a person of a very generous and kindly spirit who was much concerned with the evangelisation of the invading Lombards.

He died at Corfinio, of which he was also bishop, probably shortly after 700.

He is the patron saint of the cities of Sulmona, Spoltore and Scerni, where there are churches dedicated to him, including Sulmona Cathedral.  His feast is April 28.

References
 San Panfilo di Sulmona 

7th-century births
7th-century Italian bishops
8th-century Christian saints
8th-century deaths
Bishops in Abruzzo
Italian Roman Catholic saints